Ferreyrella is a genus of Peruvian flowering plants in the family Asteraceae.

 Species
 Ferreyrella cuatrecasasii R.M.King & H.Rob.
 Ferreyrella peruviana S.F.Blake

References

Eupatorieae
Asteraceae genera
Endemic flora of Peru